Vampire War (also called the Hunters trilogy) is the third trilogy in The Saga of Darren Shan by Darren Shan. It contains the novels Hunters of the Dusk, Allies of the Night and Killers of the Dawn. This trilogy continues the war between vampires and vampaneze. Mr Tiny forms a group of three "hunters" - Darren Shan, Mr Crepsley and new character Vancha March, a Vampire Prince who lives in the wild and follows the old vampire traditions, and has unusually pink skin from staying out in the sun too long. Also, Lady Evanna, who may or may not be a witch, comes along with them. She tells Darren that either he or the Vampaneze Lord will be the Lord of Shadows. But instead of that being on his mind: he only will have four opportunities to kill the Vampaneze Lord, or else the vampires will be destroyed. But there is a gruesome twist involving the Vampaneze Lord and Darren's childhood friend, Steve "Leopard" Leonard, who is the dreaded Vampaneze Lord himself.

References

External links
Vampire War information

The Saga of Darren Shan
Novel series
Fantasy novel trilogies